The 2014–15 Merrimack Warriors men's ice hockey team represented Merrimack College during the 2014–15 NCAA Division I men's ice hockey season. The team was coached by Mark Dennehy, in his 10th season with the Warriors. The Warriors played their home games at Lawler Arena on campus in North Andover, Massachusetts, competing in Hockey East. The Warriors finished the season with a record of 16–18–4, 5–14–3 in Hockey East play to finish in 11th place. The qualified for the 2015 Hockey East Men's Ice Hockey Tournament, where they were eliminated in the quarterfinals by Boston University.

Personnel

Roster
As of December 1, 2014.

Coaching staff

Standings

Schedule

|-
!colspan=12 style=""| Exhibition

|-
!colspan=12 style=""| Regular Season

|-
!colspan=12 style=""| Postseason

Rankings

References

Merrimack Warriors men's ice hockey seasons
Merrimack Warriors
Merrimack Warriors
Merri
Merri